Crossings is a 1982 bonkbuster novel that was written by American Danielle Steel. It is Steel's 13th novel. It was adapted into a six-part miniseries of the same name in 1986.

Plot
The ship Normandie makes a voyage from Washington, D.C. to France despite an impending war. Aboard the ship is American Liane de Villiers, the young wife of an old ambassador to France.

List of characters

Liane Crockett de Villiers – A daughter of a world shipping enterprise, Crockett Shippings, who marries Armand after his wife's death

Armand de Villiers – Ambassador of France to the US, having returned to France, who works for the Vichy Regime of German-occupied France

Odile de Villiers – Wife of Armand who dies early

Nicholas Burnham – President of an enterprise in steel business, Burnham Steel, who first meets Liane during crossing the Atlantic

Hillary Burnham – Unfaithful wife of Nick who refuses to divorce him

Johnny Burnham – Only son of Nicholas and Hillary

References

1982 American novels
American romance novels
Novels by Danielle Steel
American novels adapted into television shows
Delacorte Press books
Bonkbuster romance novels